Rhyme & Reason may refer to:
 A Rhyme & Reason, the debut album from American heavy metal band Against All Will
 Rhyme & Reason (Missing Persons album), a 1984 album by American New Wave band Missing Persons
 Rhyme & Reason (Ted Nash album), a 1999 album by Ted Nash Double Quartet
 Rhyme and Reason (TV show), an American television game show hosted by Bob Eubanks that aired on ABC from 1975–76
 "Rhyme & Reason" (song), a 1994 song by Dave Matthews Band
 Rhyme & Reason (film), a 1997 documentary film about rap and hip hop
 Rhyme & Reason (soundtrack), a 1997 soundtrack to the movie Rhyme & Reason

See also 
 "Rhyme or Reason", a 2013 song on Eminem's album The Marshall Mathers LP 2